In materials science and mathematics, functionally graded elements are elements used in finite element analysis. They can be used to describe a functionally graded material.

See also 
 Graded (mathematics)

Finite element method
Materials science